Dysgonia humilis is a moth of the family Noctuidae first described by William Jacob Holland in 1894. It is found in Africa, including Príncipe and Gabon.

References

Dysgonia
Insects of Cameroon
Moths of Africa
Insects of West Africa
Fauna of Gabon